Kapfenberger SV is an Austrian association football club from Kapfenberg. They won the 2007–08 Austrian Football First League and advanced to the Austrian Bundesliga. The club was founded in 1919 as Kapfenberger SC. The club was renamed into Kapfenberger SV in 1947 and currently play in the Austrian Second League, the second level of Austrian football.

Current squad
Out on loan

Manager history

 Unknown (1919–1946)
  Josef Blum (1946–1947)
 Unknown (1947–1974)
  Hermann Stessl (1974–1975)
 Unknown (1975–1980)
  Walter Peintinger (1980–1982)
 Unknown (1982–1987)
  Robert Pflug (1987)
 Unknown (1987–1990)
  Gerd Struppert (1990–1991)
 Unknown (1991–1994)
  Ladislav Jurkemik (1994–1996)
 Unknown'' (1996–2000)
  Hans-Peter Schaller (2000–2006)
  Drazen Svalina (2006)
  Ljubiša Sušić (2006)
  Werner Gregoritsch (2006–11)
  Manfred Unger (2011)
  Thomas von Heesen (2011–12)
  Klaus Schmidt (2012–13)
  Kurt Russ (2013–16)
  Abdulah Ibraković (2016–2017)
  Robert Pflug (2017)
  Stefan Rapp (2017–)

References

External links
 Official website 
 Kapfenberger SV at Football Squads.co.uk
 Kapfenberger SV at National Football teams.com
 Kapfenberger SV at Football-Lineups.com

 
Association football clubs established in 1919
1919 establishments in Austria
Kapfenberg
Football clubs in Austria